The ileal arteries are branches of the superior mesenteric artery which supply blood to the ileum.

Arteries of the abdomen